Dulhera is a village on State Highway 22, the Jhajjar–Bahadurgarh road, 13 km from Jhajjar and 15 km from Bahadurgarh. Kablana is a nearby village. Jagan Nath University, NCR is a university between Kablana and Dulhera villages. Dulhera's pincode is 124507.

In Dulhera there is a temple named Baba Ashanand Temple (aashiya) and an old temple of Lord Shiva called Shivalya. On bupania road outside from Dulhera village there is Baba Haridas Temple (sedhda).

References

Villages in Jhajjar district